Behenic acid (also docosanoic acid) is a carboxylic acid, the saturated fatty acid with formula . In appearance, it consists of white solid although impure samples appear yellowish.

Sources
At 9%, it is a major component of ben oil (or behen oil), which is extracted from the seeds of the drumstick tree (Moringa oleifera). It is so named from the Persian month Bahman, when the roots of this tree were harvested.

Behenic acid is also present in some other oils and oil-bearing plants, including rapeseed (canola) and peanut oil and skins. It is estimated that one ton of peanut skins contains  of behenic acid.

Properties
As a dietary oil, behenic acid is poorly absorbed. In spite of its low bioavailability compared with oleic acid, behenic acid is a cholesterol-raising saturated fatty acid in humans.

Uses 
Commercially, behenic acid is often used to give hair conditioners and moisturizers their smoothing properties. It is also used in lubricating oils, and as a solvent evaporation retarder in paint removers. Its amide is used as an anti-foaming agent in detergents, floor polishes and dripless candles. Reduction of behenic acid yields behenyl alcohol.

Pracaxi oil (from the seeds of Pentaclethra macroloba) is a natural product with one of the highest concentrations of behenic acid, and is used in hair conditioners.

See also 
 Behenyl alcohol
 Glyceryl behenate
 Silver behenate

References 

Fatty acids
Alkanoic acids